Turun NMKY (YMCA Turku) is a Finnish professional basketball club, based in Turku. The club plays in men's I-B-division.

History
Turun NMKY was founded in 1920. The team has played in a total of 32 through the top league level championships. NMKY has won the championship in Finland and the Finnish Cup, both four times. In the 1996-2000 period the club was also known as Piiloset. In 2000, the Turun NMKY dropped on SM-series due to non-performing debt. After a period of 2007 to 2008 it gave up from the I-division. The rise back to the I-division occurred 2012. However, the team played just one year, I division, and 2014-2015 II-division.

Honours & achievements
Finnish League
 Winners (4): 1972-73, 1974–75, 1976–77, 1981-82
Finnish Cup
 Winners (4): 1972, 1976, 1982, 1999
 Runners-up (1): 1981

References

External links

Basketball teams established in 1920
Basketball teams in Finland
Sports clubs in Finland
Sport in Turku
Sports clubs founded by the YMCA
1920 establishments in Finland